Pancit Estacion is a type of pancit, or stir-fried rice noodle dish, which originated in Tanza, Cavite, Philippines. Its main ingredient is mung bean sprouts (used as a substitute for rice noodles). Its sauce includes corn starch, atsuete, tinapa and kamias

See also
Pancit choca

References

estacion
Culture of Cavite
Fried noodles
Cavite cuisine
Tanza, Cavite